Koroška Vas is a settlement in the hills south of Novo Mesto in southeastern Slovenia. The area is part of the traditional region of Lower Carniola and is now included in the Southeast Slovenia Statistical Region.

Name
The name Koroška vas literally means 'Carinthian village'. It was attested in written sources in 1485 as Koroschndorf vnder Meichaw. The name refers to a settlement that was colonized by arrivals from Carinthia in the Middle Ages. See also Koroška Vas na Pohorju and Koroška Bela for similar names outside Carinthia.

References

External links

Koroška Vas on Geopedia

Populated places in the City Municipality of Novo Mesto